Jacques Houdek (born Željko Houdek; 14 April 1981) is a Croatian recording artist who represented Croatia in the Eurovision Song Contest 2017 with the song "My Friend". Houdek began his professional solo career in 2000 and has since released many recordings and albums out which 13 have been certified silver (five times), gold, platinum and diamond (once). Houdek is one of the mentors in the Croatian version of the TV talent show The Voice. During show's first season, he mentored the winner Nina Kraljić. Aside from Croatian, he has sung and recorded in English, Italian, German, Spanish, French, Slovene, Macedonian, and Māori language.

Early life and education
Jacques Houdek was born as Željko Houdek on 14 April 1981 in Velika Gorica. His last name is of Czech origin. After finishing elementary music school (piano department), Houdek enrolled in two high schools, music (solo singing department) and vocational hairdressing. He also attended singing lessons with professor Viktorija Badrov who wanted him to become an opera singer. After finishing high schools in 2001, he enrolled in prestigious Berklee College of Music, honing his singing in seminars in France, Greece and Italy. Houdek continued to build up his knowledge on Berklee seminars in Europe, where he had the opportunity to be mentored by Donna McElroy, a Grammy Award nominee.

Career 
Houdek held his first solo concert on 19 February 2000 in Zagreb club SAX! where he performed covers of various songs. His first single, the song "Čarolija" (Magic), was released in 2002 and performed by Houdek at Dora, Croatia's national competition for entry to the Eurovision Song Contest. There he was noticed by maestro Zdravko Šljivac who offered him a collaboration and publicly praised him by saying that a singer such as Houdek is born once every 300 years. The next month, Houdek signed an exclusive contract with Croatia Records, the leading music publisher in the region, with whom he has produced 13 albums. In 2004, he provided the singing voice of Aladdin for the Croatian dub of the Aladdin franchise, with Dušan Bućan voicing the character for the dialogues.

During campaign for 2007 parliamentary election, Houdek sang party anthem "HDZ zna" (HDZ Knows) for the conservative Croatian Democratic Union (HDZ) which was at the time ran by Ivo Sanader. He later also sang for the mayoral campaign of the populist Milan Bandić. Houdek said in an interview for Jutarnji list that he is apolitical and that those were just professional engagements as any other.

In January 2011, Houdek placed fourth in the finals of the Open Mic UK singing contest held in London's O2 Arena. He also participated in the British TV show X Factor, where he was given the nickname "Croatian Sensation" and entered the top 100 candidates. He was unable to continue his participation in the contest because he did not receive a work permit in time.

In February 2017, Houdek was selected to represent Croatia at the Eurovision Song Contest in Kyiv, Ukraine. He qualified for the final, achieving eighth place in the second semi-final and eventually 13th place in the grand final with the song "My Friend". 

Over the years, he has performed in the Zagreb's Gavella and Komedija theaters, Lincoln Center for the Performing Arts, on the occasion of the tenth anniversary of his career, the Croatian National Theatre in Zagreb, and has sold out solo concert in Vatroslav Lisinski Concert Hall for five times.

Controversy
In 2005, Houdek said in an interview for the Tena magazine that "gay and lesbian population cannot be equal with other citizens because it means a return to Sodom and Gomorrah", and has called same-sex unions "sick" for which he was named the "Homophobe of the Year" in 2006 in a selection organised by the main Croatian LGBT portal Gay.hr. In a report from 2005, the International Lesbian, Gay, Bisexual, Trans and Intersex Association (ILGA) listed him as "a public figure who gave homophobic statements". In 2011, Houdek was nominated for the title "Homophobe of the Decade" by the LGBT Zagreb Pride organisation which called him "without doubt the biggest homophobe in Croatian showbiz". In response, Houdek published a public statement on Facebook titled "Love and Music are My Driving Forces" in which he expressed his regret for being included in the selection, adding that he was gay-friendly and had nothing against love of any kind.

Private life
Houdek is married to Brigita Krkač since 2006 with whom he has two children, daughter Sofija (b. 2006) and son David (b. 2013).

Discography

Studio albums

Live albums

Compilation albums

Singles

As lead artist

As featured artist

Awards and recognitions 
Four-time winner of the Croatian music award Porin.
 Best new artist
 Best performance by a male singer
 Best album of children's music
 Best Christmas-themed album
Porin nominations:
 Hit of the year
 Best pop album 
 Best vocal collaboration
 Best album of tambura music

Festival awards 
 Bihaćki festival (2nd and 3rd award), 2004
 Melodije Kvarnera (Grand Prix), 2004
 Banjalučki festival (Best vocal performance), 2005
 Radijski festival BiH (Best Croatian performer), 2005
 Bihaćki festival (Best vocal performance), 2006
 Krapinski festival (2nd jury prize), 2007
 Radio M, BiH (Best Croatian performer), 2008
 Mostar (Grand Prix), 2009
 Budva (Best arrangement and 3rd jury prize), 2009
 Ohrid fest (1st jury prize), 2009
 HRF (Musical editors' award), 2009
 CMC festival (Most played song of the year), 2010
 Narodni radio (TOP 10 songs of 2016), 2017

TV, concert and other professional achievements 

 2003 – jury member of the musical reality show 'Story Supernova' (Nova TV)
 2007 – jury member of the musical reality show 'Showtime' (Nova TV)
 2007 and 2010 – winner of CNT's show 'Zvijezde pjevaju' ['Just the Two of Us'] (Croatian Radiotelevision)
 2015 – winning mentor in the TV-show 'THE VOICE' (CRT)
 Thousands of concerts and performances across Croatia and the region
 Supported hundreds of charity initiatives and concerts
 2007-today – sold out the Vatroslav Lisinski Concert Hall 12 times as a solo performer
 14/05/2006 – Concert album promotion at the Gavella theater in Zagreb
 14/02/2007 – Valentine's Day at the Komedija
 19/12/2010 – Lincoln Center, New York, 10th career anniversary concert
 19/02/2012 – Gala-concert 'Jacques Houdek & divas', Croatian National Theater in Zagreb
 12/08/2016 – Big Summer Stage in Opatija, gala-concert 'The Greatest Voice Sings for You'
 20/11/2016 – Croatian National Theater in Split, 'Two Voices – Two Instruments', Jacques Houdek & Nina Kraljić
 2007-today – regular entry in the TOP 20 most listened performers in Croatia (according to the report of the Croatian Union for the Protection of Performers' Rights)
 2016 – played the leading role in the children's spectacle 'Kraš's Sweet Fairytale' (sold out 23 times)
 Jacques is a full member of the Croatian Composers' Society (HDS) and the author of many of his hit songs.

Professional collaborations 
Musicians
Goran Kovačić, Robert Vrbančić, Alan Dović, Kristijan Zebić, Krunoslav Dražić, Antun Stašić, Ante Gelo, Krunoslav Levačić, Dalibor Marinković, Davor Černigoj, Nebojša Buhin,  Zlatan Došlić, Igor Geržina et al.

Producers
Predrag Martinjak, Tihomir Ivanetić, Bojan Šalomon, Nikša Bratoš, David Vurdelja, Tihomir Preradović, Mahir Sarihodžić, Olja Dešić, Boris Đurđević, Dalibor Paurić, Hrvoje Runtić et al.

Composers 
Ante Pecotić, Aleksandra Milutinović, Aleksandra Kovač, Andrea Čubrić, Bruno Kovačić, Ivana Plechinger, Ines Prajo, Arijana Kunštek, Zorana Šiljeg, Tonči Huljić, Ivica Krajač, Ivan Škunca et al.

Conductors
Zdravko Šljivac, Alan Bjelinski, Siniša Leopold, Stipica Kalogjera, Nikica Kalogjera, Joško Banov et al.

Ensembles 
Girls' Choir 'Zvjezdice', Children's choir 'Klinci s Ribnjaka', Zagreb Soloists, Croatian Radiotelevision Jazz Orchestra, Ante Gelo Big Band, Nikša Bratoš Band, Krunoslav Dražić's Tambura Orchestra, Croatian Radiotelevision's Tambura Orchestra, Antun Stašić's Maestro Orchestra et al.

Singers
Tereza Kesovija, Gabi Novak, Josipa Lisac, Radojka Šverko, Vera Svoboda, Zdenka Kovačiček, Zdenka Vučković, Doris Dragović, Nina Badrić, Vanna, Ivana Kindl, Ivana Husar, Maja Blagdan, Kaliopi, Oliver Dragojević, Krunoslav Slabinac, Tony Cetinski, Massimo, Marko Tolja, Erato group et al.

References

External links
 

1981 births
Living people
Croatian pop singers
21st-century Croatian male singers
Croatian tenors
Eurovision Song Contest entrants for Croatia
Eurovision Song Contest entrants of 2017
Croatian people of Czech descent
People from Velika Gorica
Musicians from Zagreb